Lieutenant-Colonel Leigh Arbuthnot Alexander (4 July 1898 – 28 April 1943) was a British Army officer and cricketer.

Early life
Alexander was the son of Major William Alexander and Ethel Rubina Arbuthnot and brother of Gilbert Alexander. He was born at Umzinto, Colony of Natal, South Africa.

Military career
Alexander joined the Gurkhas on 11 May 1917 during the First World War and first saw service on the North West Frontier. He was commissioned into the British Indian Army on the 27 October 1917. He was promoted to Captain in 1922 and to Major in 1935.

In the Second World War he commanded the 3rd Battalion, 2nd Gurkha Rifles, and took part in the 1st Chindit expedition, a deep penetration raid behind Japanese lines, with the 77th Indian Infantry Brigade, when he died during the operation. His is buried in Taukkyan War Cemetery.

Cricket
He played first-class cricket in three matches in the 1920s.

References

External links

1898 births
1943 deaths
People from uMdoni Local Municipality
White South African people
Indian Army personnel killed in World War II
Royal Gurkha Rifles officers
South African cricketers
Europeans cricketers
Indian Army personnel of World War I
Burials at Taukkyan War Cemetery
Cricketers from KwaZulu-Natal